Xanthodes is a genus of moths of the family Nolidae. The genus was erected by Achille Guenée in 1852.

Species
 Xanthodes albago (Fabricius, 1794)
 Xanthodes amata Walker, 1865
 Xanthodes congenita (Hampson, 1912)
 Xanthodes dinarodes (Hampson, 1912)
 Xanthodes dohertyi (C. Swinhoe, 1918)
 Xanthodes emboloscia (Turner, 1902)
 Xanthodes gephyrias (Meyrick, 1902)
 Xanthodes intersepta Guenée, 1852
 Xanthodes tabulata (C. Swinhoe, 1918)
 Xanthodes transversa Guenée, 1852

References

Chloephorinae